Strahinja Mićović (born 17 June 1992) is a Serbian professional basketball player who currently plays for MZT Skopje] of the ABA League and the Macedonian League.

Career
Mićović spent the first three years of his career with BKK Radnički and OKK Beograd. He also had an unsuccessful trial at Partizan NIS during the 2013 pre-season.

Mićović signed with FMP coached by Milan Gurović after a successful trial which took place during the 2014 pre-season. For the 2015–16 season, he moved to Borac Čačak. On July 16, 2016, Mićović signed a 1+1 deal with Bosnian team Igokea. On 1 July 2017, Mićović signed with Mornar Bar.

On 24 July 2019, Mićović signed with Mitteldeutscher BC of the Basketball Bundesliga. He averaged 13.0 points and 4.5 rebounds per game. On 13 August 2020, Mićović signed with Telekom Baskets Bonn.

References

External links
 Profile at eurobasket.com
 Profile at fiba.com

1992 births
Living people
ABA League players
Basketball League of Serbia players
KK Borac Čačak players
KK FMP players
KK Igokea players
KK Mornar Bar players
Mitteldeutscher BC players
OKK Beograd players
Power forwards (basketball)
BKK Radnički players
Serbian expatriate basketball people in Bosnia and Herzegovina
Serbian expatriate basketball people in Germany
Serbian expatriate basketball people in Montenegro
Serbian men's basketball players
Telekom Baskets Bonn players